Paraplatyptilia terminalis is a moth of the family Pterophoridae that is found in Russia (the West Siberian Lowland, the South Siberian Mountains, Central Yakutian Lowland and Kamchatka) and Bosnia and Herzegovina.

References

Moths described in 1877
terminalis
Moths of Europe
Moths of Asia